Mall of Abilene is an enclosed shopping mall in Abilene, Texas. It is located in the south side of the city, at the southwest corner of Buffalo Gap Road and US 83/84 (Winters Freeway). Occupying a 61-acre plot of land, It serves a 22-county trade area. Five stores anchor the mall JCPenney, Dillard's, Best Buy, Ulta, and Books-A-Million with one vacant anchor last occupied by Sears. The mall also houses the  Premiere Cinema 10 in a converted UA Theaters 6. The mall's gross leasable area of nearly  consists of a total of 80 stores, excluding the theater, 7 of which have a leasable area of at least . As of 2005, the mall generates 8.7 million visitors per year.

History 

The Mall of Abilene began its development in 1977, when ground was broken for a new shopping complex in the growing southern reaches of Abilene. Developed by Paul Broadhead & Associates, the complex would initially cost $28 million to develop, with the mall opening to shoppers in March 1979.

The mall would open with Dillard's, JCPenney, Sears, H. J. Wilson Co. (later Service Merchandise, now the second Dillard's store) and Grissom's (later Dunlap's, now Best Buy, Books-a-Million, and Ulta) as its anchor stores.

The mall's initial junior anchors would be Beall's, UA Theaters 6, Lerner's and Luby's Cafeteria.

Some original inline tenants would include; Chik-Fil-A (now closed), Express, GNC, El Chico, Footaction, Motherhood Maternity, Spencer's and Zales; all of which have been at the mall for the last 40 years.

As the years progressed the makeup of these tenants had partially changed, at one point Grissom's was replaced by Dunlaps. Wilson's would re-open as Service Merchandise in 1985.

Later on, tenants like Ulta Beauty and Chuck-E-Cheese would occupy the two spaces next to the main entrance, with the vacant Luby's becoming Ulta Beauty.

On December 28, 2018, it was announced that Sears would be closing as part of a plan to close 80 stores nationwide. The store closed in March 2019.

Tenants

Anchors

 Books-A-Million - 16,000 s.f.
 Best Buy - 24,000 s.f.
 Dillard's North (Men's) - 63,404 s.f.
 JCPenney - 96,108 s.f.
 Dillard's South (Women's) - 98,828 s.f.
 Sears - 142,604 s.f. [Vacant]

Specialty Stores 

 Aeropostale
 American Eagle Outfitters
 Buckle
 Express
 Finish Line
 Hibbett Sports
 Space Golf
 Hot Topic
 LensCrafters
 Shoe Dept.
 Spencer Gifts
 Victoria's Secret

Restaurants
 Chuck E. Cheese
 Coastal Cookies
 Dante's
 Dippin Dots
 El Chico
 Joe Muggs (inside Books-A-Million)

Cinemas 
 Premiere Cinema 10

References

External links 
 Mall of Abilene

Buildings and structures in Abilene, Texas
Shopping malls in Texas
Shopping malls established in 1979
JLL (company)